USS Shrike (AMS/MSC-201) was a  acquired by the US Navy for clearing coastal minefields.

Construction
Shrike was laid down on 1 September 1953, Tampa Marine Company, Tampa, Florida; launched on 21 July 1954, as AMS-201; sponsored by Mrs. A. John Miller; reclassified a coastal minesweeper, MSC-201 on 7 February; and commissioned on 21 March 1955.

East Coast operations  
Shrike sailed from Tampa on 2 April, for Charleston, South Carolina, arriving there on 5 April. From 15 May to 24 June, she conducted shakedown training at Key West, Florida. She returned to Charleston on 26 June. For the remainder of the year, the minesweeper operated between Charleston and Key West as a unit of Mine Squadron 4. Shrike was assigned to the Mine Force, Atlantic Fleet, and the operational control of Commander, Operational Test and Evaluation Force, Atlantic Fleet, with her homeport at Key West.

Supporting missile testing and search and rescue 
The minesweeper operated out of that port until 30 June 1965. During these years, the ship conducted local operations, conducted experiments with new equipment, evaluated new type mines, and provided services for the missile testing facility at Cape Canaveral Air Force Station. In November 1963, her evaluation testing was interrupted when she was deployed to locate and assist in the salvage of a downed U-2 aircraft in Florida Bay.

Reassigned as minesweeper  
On 30 June 1965, Shrikes homeport was changed to Charleston; she was assigned to Mine Division 42, and her status was changed from an experimental ship to a sweeper in the mine force. She conducted operations from Charleston for the next three years which took her as far north as Newport, Rhode Island, as far south as the Caribbean, and one trip to New Orleans, Louisiana.

Service as a training ship  
On 27 September 1968, Shrike was decommissioned at Wilmington, North Carolina, and became a US Naval Reserve training ship for the 6th Naval District.

Decommissioning 
Shrike was struck from the Naval Register, 1 July 1975, and scrapped, April 1978. Fate: unknown.

Notes 

Citations

Bibliography 

Online resources

External links 
 

 

Bluebird-class minesweepers
Ships built in Tampa, Florida
1954 ships
Cold War minesweepers of the United States
Adjutant-class minesweepers